The 2022 Open Sopra Steria de Lyon was a professional tennis tournament played on clay courts. It was the 6th edition of the tournament which was part of the 2022 ATP Challenger Tour. It took place in Lyon, France, between 6 and 12 June 2022.

Singles main-draw entrants

Seeds

 1 Rankings are as of 23 May 2022.

Other entrants
The following players received wildcards into the singles main draw:
  Ugo Blanchet
  Kyrian Jacquet
  Luca Van Assche

The following player received entry into the singles main draw as a special exempt:
  Tomás Barrios Vera

The following players received entry from the qualifying draw:
  Kimmer Coppejans
  Gabriel Décamps
  Arthur Fils
  Ivan Gakhov
  Shang Juncheng
  Alexey Vatutin

The following players received entry as lucky losers:
  Maxime Janvier
  Juan Bautista Torres

Champions

Singles

 Corentin Moutet def.  Pedro Cachín 6–4, 6–4.

Doubles

 Romain Arneodo /  Jonathan Eysseric def.  Sander Arends /  David Pel 7–5, 4–6, [10–4].

References

2022 ATP Challenger Tour
2022
2022 in French tennis
June 2022 sports events in France